Calathus albanicus is a species of ground beetle from the Platyninae subfamily that can be found in Albania, Kosovo,  Montenegro, North Macedonia, Serbia, and Voivodina.

References

albanicus
Beetles described in 1906
Beetles of Europe